Cosipara smithi is a moth in the family Crambidae. It was described by Herbert Druce in 1896. It is found in Mexico.

The forewings are silvery grey to brown. The hindwings are creamy white, the outer margin edged with pale brown.

References

Moths described in 1896
Scopariinae